The Blalock House is a historic home in Venice, Florida, United States. It is located at 241 South Harbor Drive. On April 12, 1989, it was added to the U.S. National Register of Historic Places.

The home is a two-story Mediterranean Revival style residence constructed of rough cast stucco over a wood frame.

References

External links
 Sarasota County listings at National Register of Historic Places
 Sarasota County listings at Florida's Office of Cultural and Historical Programs

Houses on the National Register of Historic Places in Sarasota County, Florida
Houses completed in 1925
Mediterranean Revival architecture in Florida